Garcinia terpnophylla is a species of flowering plant in the Clusiaceae. It is found only in Sri Lanka where it is known as කොකටිය (kokatiya) in Sinhala.

Varieties
 Garcinia terpnophylla var. terpnophylla.
 Garcinia terpnophylla var. acuminate.

References

External links
 
 
 https://www.gbif.org/species/110270099

terpnophylla
Endemic flora of Sri Lanka
Vulnerable flora of Asia
Taxobox binomials not recognized by IUCN